Halloumi or haloumi is a traditional Cypriot cheese made from a mixture of goat's and sheep's milk, and sometimes also cow's milk. Its texture is described as squeaky. It has a high melting point and so can easily be fried or grilled, a property that makes it a popular meat substitute. Rennet (mostly vegetarian or microbial) is used to curdle the milk in halloumi production, although no acid-producing bacteria are used in its preparation.

Halloumi is often associated with the island of Cyprus, where it has been produced by a multi-ethnic population for many centuries. It is also popular throughout the Eastern Mediterranean. It became widely available in Turkey after 2000. By 2013, demand in the United Kingdom had surpassed that in every other European country except Cyprus. 

In the United States, Halloumi is a registered trademark owned by the government of Cyprus, while in the UK it is owned by the Foundation for the Protection of the Traditional Cheese of Cyprus named Halloumi. It is also protected as a geographical indication in the EU, as a Protected Designation of Origin (PDO), which means within the EU only products made in certain parts of Cyprus can be called "halloumi". PDO protection for Halloumi was delayed largely by disagreements among farmers of cattle, sheep, and goats regarding the inclusion of cows' milk, and (if cows' milk were included) the proportion of it.

Etymology
The English name halloumi is derived from Modern  , khalloúmi, from Cypriot Maronite Arabic xallúm, ultimately from Egyptian   . 

The name of the cheese likely goes back to the Demotic word ḥlm "cheese" attested in manuscripts and ostraca from 2nd-century Roman Egypt.

The Cypriot Turkish name  derives from this source, as does the name of the different modern Egyptian cheese .

History

The methods of making halloumi likely originated sometime in the Medieval Byzantine period (AD 3951191). A recipe for enhancing ḥalūm ('cheese') by brining is found in the 14th-century Egyptian cookbook 
كنز الفوائد في تنويع الموائد : Kanz al-Fawāʾid fī Tanwīʿ al-Mawāʾid.

The earliest known surviving descriptions of Cypriot halloumi were recorded in the mid-16th century by Italian visitors to Cyprus, where it is often said to have originated. However, the question of whether the recipe for the quintessential halloumi was born in Cyprus and then travelled to Lebanon and the rest of the Levant, or whether the basic techniques of making cheese that resists melting evolved over time in various parts of the eastern Mediterranean—or both—does not have a definitive answer.

Traditionally, halloumi was made from sheep and goat milk, since there were few cows on the island until they were brought over by the British in the 20th century. But as demand grew, industrial cheese-makers began using more of the cheaper and more plentiful cow's milk.

Overview and preparation

Halloumi is often used in cooking, and can be fried until brown without melting due to its higher-than-typical melting point. This makes it an excellent cheese for frying or grilling (as in saganaki) or fried and served with vegetables, or as an ingredient in salads. There are many recipes that use halloumi beyond simple grilling. 

Traditional halloumi is a semicircular shape, weighing . The fat content is approximately 25% wet weight, 47% dry weight with about 17% protein. Its firm texture when cooked causes it to squeak on the teeth when being chewed.

Traditional halloumi is made from unpasteurised sheep and goat milk. Aged halloumi is also popular. Kept in its brine, it is much drier, much stronger and much saltier.

Sealed, halloumi can last in a refrigerator for as long as a year.

Nutritional facts
 of commercially produced packaged halloumi typically contains:

See also 

 
 Bread cheese

References

External links
 
 

Arab cuisine
Cypriot cuisine
Byzantine cuisine
Cow's-milk cheeses
Goat's-milk cheeses
Sheep's-milk cheeses
Stretched-curd cheeses
Syrian cuisine
Palestinian cuisine
Iraqi cuisine
Israeli cuisine
Egyptian cuisine
Lebanese cuisine
Levantine cuisine
Cheeses
Cypriot cheeses
Middle Eastern cheeses
Turkish cheeses